Snakes is a 2014 album by avant-garde music group Psychic TV. It was written after Genesis P-Orridge's trip to Benin and is lyrically focused on the voodoo culture.

Track listing

Personnel
Alice Genese - bass guitar, backing vocals
Edward O'Dowd - drums, percussion, sampling, producer
Jeff Berner - engineer, guitar, mixing, programming, synth
Gary Atturio - engineer
Jess Stewart - keyboards and piano (tracks: 3, 4, 5, 6, 7, 8)
Genesis Breyer P-Orridge - lead vocals
Alex DeTurk - mastering
John Weingarten - piano (track: 1)
Phillip Cope  - theremin (track: 5)
John Jackson  - violin (tracks: 1, 3, 5, 6)

External links

 Brooklyn Vegan article mentioning the release of the album

Psychic TV albums
2014 albums